S. Joseph (born 1965) is an Indian poet writing in Malayalam in the post modern era. He was born in the village of Pattithanam near Ettumanoor. He has published a number of works on contemporary issues that affect the common man and also the ones who toil in the lower rungs of the society. His poetry collection Uppante Kooval Varakkunnu won the 2012 Kerala Sahitya Akademi Award.

Bibliography 
Poetry collections
 Karutha Kallu (Kottayam: D. C. Books, 2000) 
 Meenkaran (Kottayam: D. C. Books, 2003)
 Identity card (Kottayam: D. C. Books, 2005)
 Uppante Kooval Varakkunnu (Kottayam: D. C. Books, 2011)
 Vellam Ethra Lalithamanu (2011).
  Chandranodoppam (DC Books:Kottayam)

References

External links
 A Poem by S. Joseph

Further reading 
 Satyanarayana, K & Tharu, Susie (2011) No Alphabet in Sight: New Dalit Writing from South Asia, Dossier 1: Tamil and Malayalam, New Delhi: Penguin Books.
 Satyanarayana, K & Tharu, Susie (2013) From those Stubs Steel Nibs are Sprouting: New Dalit Writing from South Asia, Dossier 2: Kannada and Telugu, New Delhi: HarperCollins India.

1965 births
Living people
Indian male poets
People from Kottayam district
Malayali people
Malayalam-language writers
Malayalam poets
Recipients of the Kerala Sahitya Akademi Award
Poets from Kerala
20th-century Indian poets
20th-century Indian male writers